Wyndham Central College, formerly the Werribee Technical School and Galvin Park Secondary College (GPSC) is the former name of a government high school in the outer Melbourne suburb of Werribee, Victoria, Australia. In 2013, Galvin Park Secondary College was renamed Wyndham Central College.

Wyndham Central College has a student population of about 1300, offering a curriculum for years 7-12. As well as the Victorian Certificate of Education (VCE), the Victorian Certificate of Applied Learning (VCAL) programme is also offered for years 11 and 12 students.

See also 
 List of schools in Victoria

External links
 Wyndham Central College website

Public high schools in Melbourne
Schools in Wyndham
Educational institutions established in 1905
1905 establishments in Australia
Werribee, Victoria